Balatlar Church or Sinope Koimesis Church was built in A.D. 660 by the Byzantines as a rectangular basilica. The church is located in the northern province of Sinop, Turkey, on the shores of the Black Sea. 

All frescoes of Jesus, Mary, mother of Jesus and saints are heavily damaged because of the human and weather factors.

Archaeological excavations 
Since 2009 the site has been the scene of archaeological excavations by Mimar Sinan Fine Arts University under the direction of Professor Gülgün Köroğlu of the university's art history department. Turkish archaeologists have found a piece of a stone with crosses carved on it.

In remarks to the press, Köroğlu said: “We have found a holy thing in a chest. It is a piece of a cross, and we think it was [part of the True Cross ]. This stone chest is very important to us. It has a history and is the most important artifact we have unearthed so far." Köroğlu added, "We have also found a number of human bones during our excavation, we have been working here for four years and have found more than 2,000 skeletons. We have learned many things during the excavation that we did not previously know.”

Many mosaics have been discovered during the excavations.

References 

660s establishments in the Byzantine Empire
7th-century churches in Turkey
2009 archaeological discoveries
Basilica churches in Asia
Buildings and structures in Sinop Province
Byzantine church buildings in Turkey
Byzantine sites in Anatolia